Áed mac Néill may refer to:

 Áed Oirdnide (died 819), son of Niall Frossach
 Áed Findliath (died 879), son of Niall Caille